The 2021 European Karate Championships was the 56th edition of the European Karate Championships and 3rd European Para Karate Championships, and was held in Poreč, Croatia from 19 to 23 May 2021.

Medal table

Medalists

Men

Women

Participating nations 
513 athletes from 47 nations competed.

Para-Karate

Medal table

Participating nations 
49 athletes from 16 nations competed.

References

External links
 Results book – Karate
Results book – Parakarate

European Championships, 2021
2021 in Croatian sport
2021
2021
Karate competitions in Croatia
May 2021 sports events in Croatia